ENS 700 Field is a multipurpose athletic and recreation field at San Diego State University (SDSU), located in the center of campus at the intersection of Campanile Mall and Aztec Walk.  ENS 700 Field is the home field of the Aztecs men's and women's rugby teams.

History and construction
The site has always been a recreation field dating back to when San Diego State College first moved onto Montezuma Mesa at the beginning of the 1930s. In addition to being a recreation field it was also initially the location of the college's baseball field (with home plate in the south-west corner). With the construction of the Music and Dance Department building on the north-west corner of the site, the baseball field was moved to the current site of Tony Gwynn Stadium, the baseball diamond was converted to softball and a row of tennis courts were constructed along the western edge of the site separating it from what was then the Aztec Bowl and is now Viejas Arena. The tennis courts have since been demolished.

With continual upgrades, expansion and building projects on campus since the early 1930s, what was initially a field on the edge of campus had, over the intervening 90 years, become an eye-sore adjacent to the main entrance and en route to two of the most popular venues at the University, the Open Air Theatre and the Viejas Arena. Additionally, close to a century of development in the College Area meant that open space is now at a premium and there are no longer many areas where sport and recreation can take place; much of the available field space on campus is reserved for use by the athletic teams. It was proposed that the field be renovated to provide the student body with a suitable space for activity classes, recreation and sport-club use, as well as to improve the general appearance of the main pedestrian thoroughfare into the campus core.

The student body were polled in a referendum in the Spring Semester of 2018 and they approved a large-scale expansion and renovation of the Aztec Recreation Center and existing recreational field space on campus. The ENS 700 Field improvements were then approved by Associated Students on November 28, 2018 before the plans were reviewed by the Recreation and Wellness Commission in the spring of 2019 and approved. The works were conducted during the summer of 2019 finishing just in time for the Fall Semester that same year.

The project was awarded the American Public Works Association's Project of the Year for 2020.

Features
One of the values of Associated Students (AS) at SDSU is sustainability, so all major AS projects must be built to be sustainable.  The renovations to ENS 700 Field prioritized both student health and sustainability.

By choosing to replace the grass with artificial turf it is hoped to allow greater usage of the facility throughout the year. As the field was to be used for rugby it necessitated installing an underlay with maximised shock reduction to reduce injuries and also a specialized infill system much cooler than traditional turf products and requiring less maintenance. Associated Students also opted for a new environmentally sustainable turf technology

The sports lighting was specifically chosen based on sustainability, using highly focused vertical LED lighting that minimizes light spill and power consumption. The lights will also greatly expand the campus community's options for evening outdoor play
 and should also improve security by illuminating the central area which serves as a walkway for students going to and from their cars and the Recreation Center as well as visitors going to other athletic and entertainment venues on campus.

A new pedestrian path and landscape improvements are also part of the project. The landscape design creates a park-like setting around the field with seating built into curvilinear terrace walls. Stepped terraces for seating are utilized on the south side of the field in lieu of retaining walls to address the grade difference. The curvilinear terrace walls, along with the meandering decomposed granite path around the perimeter of the field, help soften the edges. Lawn and pavers within the terraces help break up the concrete steps and to provide additional seating areas. Planting along the perimeter preserves the existing trees, provides shade and softens the edges.

References

External links
 ENS 700 Field home page

Rugby union stadiums in San Diego
Rugby union stadiums in California
Rugby union stadiums in the United States
San Diego State Aztecs rugby
Sports venues in San Diego